The Seniors Tour Championship was the season ending event on men's professional golf's European Seniors Tour. It was first contested in 2000 at Abu Dhabi Golf Club by Sheraton, Abu Dhabi. In 2001 it was played at PGA Golf de Catalunya, Spain, from 2002 to 2004 at Quinta da Marinha, Portugal, in 2005 and 2006 at Riffa Views, Bahrain, in 2007 at Buckinghamshire Golf Club, England and from 2008 to 2010 at Club de Campo del Mediterráneo, Spain. In 2010 the prize fund was €400,000 with €64,433 going to the winner.

Winners

External links
Coverage on the European Seniors Tour official site

Former European Senior Tour events
Golf tournaments in Spain
Golf tournaments in England
Golf tournaments in Bahrain
Golf tournaments in Portugal
Golf tournaments in the United Arab Emirates
Recurring sporting events established in 2000
Recurring sporting events disestablished in 2010